Robin Wright is an American actress who has received various awards and nominations, including a Golden Globe Award and Satellite Award. Additionally, she has been nominated for eight Primetime Emmy Awards.

Blockbuster Entertainment Awards

British Independent Film Awards

Critics' Choice Television Awards

Daytime Emmy Awards

Gold Derby Awards

Golden Globe Awards

Gotham Awards

Independent Spirit Awards

Locarno International Film Festival

Online Film & Television Association Awards

Primetime Emmy Awards

Producers Guild of America Awards

Satellite Awards

Saturn Awards

Screen Actors Guild Awards

Soap Opera Digest Awards

References

Wright, Robin